Deh Abdollah or Deh-e Abdollah or Dehabdollah may refer to:
 Deh Abdollah, Golestan
 Deh-e Abdollah, Kerman
 Deh-e Abdollah, Markazi
 Deh-e Abdollah, Sistan and Baluchestan